Fantastikids is a 2006 Philippine television drama fantasy adventure series broadcast by GMA Network. Directed by Jun Lana and Zoren Legaspi, it stars Marky Cielo, Isabella de Leon and BJ Forbes. It premiered on May 6, 2006 replacing Wag Kukurap. The series concluded on December 9, 2006 with a total of 155 episodes.

The series is streaming online on YouTube.

Cast and characters

Lead cast
 Marky Cielo as Daniel
 Isabella De Leon as Diana
 BJ Forbes as Don-Don

Supporting cast
 Glaiza de Castro as Honey
 Sandy Andolong as Melinda
 Melanie Marquez as Lucila
 Bodjie Pascua as Domeng
 Paolo Contis as Richard
 Jackie Rice as Princess
 Francine Prieto as Armana
 Ryza Cenon as Annabel
 Dominic Roco as Bogz
 Felix Roco as Atoy
 Justin Rosana as Wena
 Vangie Labalan as Bebang

References

External links
 
 

2006 Philippine television series debuts
2006 Philippine television series endings
Fantaserye and telefantasya
Filipino-language television shows
GMA Network drama series
Philippine science fiction television series
Television shows set in the Philippines